Diana Island is an uninhabited island in the Qikiqtaaluk Region of Nunavut, Canada. It lies in Diana Bay, in the north-east of Quebec's Ungava Peninsula.

External links 
 Diana Island in the Atlas of Canada - Toporama; Natural Resources Canada

Uninhabited islands of Qikiqtaaluk Region